Nam Won-gi (born 11 January 1963) is a South Korean alpine skier. He competed in three events at the 1988 Winter Olympics.

References

1963 births
Living people
South Korean male alpine skiers
Olympic alpine skiers of South Korea
Alpine skiers at the 1988 Winter Olympics
Place of birth missing (living people)
20th-century South Korean people